Under the Covers, Vol. 3 is the third collaboration between alternative rock artist Matthew Sweet and Bangles singer/guitarist Susanna Hoffs. Released by Shout! Factory on November 12, 2013, it contains 14 cover versions of songs from the 1980s.

Track listing

Bonus Tracks on iTunes Deluxe Version

Personnel

 Matthew Sweet – vocals, guitars, bass, keyboards, percussion
 Susanna Hoffs – vocals, guitar, percussion
 Dennis Taylor – bass, guitar
 Ric Menck – drums
 Andrew Brassell – Engineer, Guitar, Keyboards

References

2013 albums
Matthew Sweet albums
Susanna Hoffs albums
Covers albums
Collaborative albums
Shout! Factory albums
Albums produced by Matthew Sweet
Sequel albums